WASH complex subunit 3, formerly known as coiled-coil domain-containing protein 53 (CCDC53), is a protein that in humans is encoded by the WASHC3 gene.

References

External links

Further reading